VR Stalker is a combat flight simulator video game developed by Morpheus Interactive and originally published by American Laser Games for the 3DO.

Gameplay
VR Stalker is a combat flight simulator featuring jets such as the F-14, F-16, and A-10.

Development
VR Stalker was developed by Morpheus Interactive and was originally published by American Laser Games in the United States in 1994 as the first flight simulator for the 3DO. The following year the game was picked up for PAL region distribution by BMG Interactive. Portions of the gameplay and graphics were reworked for this release and the game had to be resubmitted to The 3DO Company for approval. Morpheus Interactive president Ken Bretschneider, who worked as a digital and fine artist for VR Stalker, later went on to co-found The Void, a company which created virtual reality entertainment attractions.

Reception
Next Generation reviewed the game, rating it three stars out of five, and stated that "A mild disappointment, but not if you are looking for fast action."

3DO Magazine gave the game two stars out of five, finding "plenty of fast, frantic action and varied missions" but that it "sits awkwardly between Shock Wave and Flying Nightmares, lacking the stunning arcade visuals of the former, while falling equally short on the realism stakes compared to the latter."

Reviews
GamePro (Jan 1995)
Electronic Gaming Monthly (Dec 1994)
Video Games & Computer Entertainment – Dec 1994
SuperGamePower (Jan, 1995)

References

External links
 VR Stalker at MobyGames

1994 video games
3DO Interactive Multiplayer games
3DO Interactive Multiplayer-only games
BMG Interactive games
Combat flight simulators
Single-player video games
Video games about virtual reality
Video games developed in the United States
Video games set in the United States